The 2016 Vermont Democratic presidential primary was held on March 1, 2016, in the state of Vermont as one of the Democratic Party's primaries ahead of the 2016 presidential election.

On the same day, dubbed "Super Tuesday," Democratic primaries were held in ten other states plus American Samoa, while the Republican Party held primaries in eleven states including their own Vermont primary.

Senator Bernie Sanders took a very strong victory in his home state, receiving over 85% of the vote and winning all 16 of the state's pledged delegates.

Opinion polling

Results

Primary date: March 1, 2016
National delegates: 26

Results by county

Analysis
Bernie Sanders won his largest victory of the entire 2016 primary season in his home state of Vermont, routing Hillary Clinton by a 72-point margin and therefore blocking her from collecting any pledged delegates from the state. He carried every county in the state. Sanders won all major demographics—age, gender, income and educational attainment levels. The electorate in Vermont was 95% white, with voters backing Sanders 86–13.

After voting in the primary, Sanders said of his chances in other Super Tuesday contests: "I am confident that if there is a large voter turnout today across this country, we will do well [...] If not we're going to be struggling."

See also
 2016 Vermont Republican presidential primary

References

Vermont
Democratic primary
2016
March 2016 events in the United States